Howard Henry Francis (26 May 1868 – 7 January 1936) was a South African cricketer.

Francis was born in Clifton, Bristol, England. A batsman, he played for Gloucestershire from 1890 to 1894 before moving to South Africa in 1895. There he played for Western Province from 1895–96 to 1902–03. His highest first-class score was 55 against Middlesex at Clifton in 1894, when he and Jack Board added 137 for the ninth wicket out of a team total of 225.

Francis was the top-scorer on either side when Lord Hawke's XI played the first match of their tour in 1898–99 against a Western Province XIII, scoring 45 in the first innings batting at number three. Three weeks later he also top-scored, with 33, in the first innings for Cape Colony against Lord Hawke's XI in the first first-class match of the tour. He played for South Africa in the two Test matches that followed, but was unsuccessful. However, he top-scored batting at number three in South Africa's second innings in the First Test, scoring 29 out of a team total of 99.

Francis was also a footballer, playing for Clifton until he moved to South Africa.

References

External links
 

1868 births
1936 deaths
South African cricketers
Gloucestershire cricketers
Western Province cricketers
South Africa Test cricketers
Cricketers from Bristol
Clifton Association F.C. players
English footballers
Wicket-keepers
Association footballers not categorized by position